Walter Lee Lingle was the 11th president of Davidson College. Lingle graduated from Davidson in 1892 and proceeded to receive his training at Union Theological Seminary. After spending a few years in the ministry, Lingle was elected to the board of trustees and eventually was appointed as president in 1929.

Lingle was able to steer Davidson during the Great Depression. The College was able to run without a deficit, cutting salaries, or releasing faculty members, in addition to overseeing several major construction projects on campus.

References 

Presidents of Davidson College
1868 births
1956 deaths